Color bleeding may refer to:

 Color bleeding (computer graphics), an effect in 3D rendering where objects cast a hue onto other objects
 Color bleeding (printing), the effect of areas of colored inks or dyes spreading into unwanted areas

See also
 Color
 Bleeding (disambiguation)